Farmers State Bank is a historic bank building at 101 South Main Street in Lindsborg, Kansas, United States, that is now the Lindsborg City Hall. The Italianate building was constructed in 1887 as a branch of the Farmers State Bank and "was the only bank of three to survive the Great Depression. In modern times the bank became a branch of Bank of America and another financial institution assumed the Farmers State name. The building became Lindsborg's City Hall in 1955 when the bank moved to a new building one-half block north of this location." The building was added to the National Register of Historic Places in 2008.

References

External links
Lindsborg City Website

Bank buildings on the National Register of Historic Places in Kansas
Buildings and structures in McPherson County, Kansas
Commercial buildings completed in 1887
Government buildings in Kansas
Lindsborg, Kansas
National Register of Historic Places in McPherson County, Kansas